The Men's Discus Throw A was one of the events held in Athletics at the 1968 Summer Paralympics in Tel Aviv.

There were 33 competitors in the heat; 6 made it into the final.

Australia's Vic Renalson achieved a throw of 22.34 metres, taking the gold medal and a setting a world record in the process.

Results

Heats

Final

References 

Discus